The Fifty50 Challenge is a women's domestic one-day cricket competition organised by Zimbabwe Cricket. The competition began in the 2020–21 season, and sees four teams competing in 50-over matches.

Eagles are the current holders, winning their first title in 2021–22. The competition runs alongside the Women's T20 Cup.

History
The tournament began in October 2020, running alongside the Women's T20 Cup. The inception of the tournament was described by its founders, Zimbabwe Cricket, as "historic", becoming the first domestic women's competition to be played in Zimbabwe since the 2008–09 Inter-Provincial Tournament, which was the only previous such tournament.

The tournament saw four teams, Eagles, Mountaineers, Rhinos and Tuskers compete in a double round-robin group stage, with the top two sides qualifying for the final. Mountaineers won the group on Net Run Rate, and went on to beat Rhinos in the final to become the inaugural winners of the competition.

The second edition of the tournament began in February 2022, with the same format and teams competing. Eagles won the tournament to claim their first one-day title, beating Rhinos by 167 runs in the final.

The third edition of the tournament began in February 2023.

Teams

Results

See also
 Women's T20 Cup
 Pro50 Championship

References

Fifty50 Challenge
Zimbabwean domestic cricket competitions
Women's cricket competitions in Zimbabwe
Recurring sporting events established in 2020
Limited overs cricket